Bruno Šiklić (born 14 March 1983) is a Croatian football player who currently plays for Manama Club in the Bahraini Premier League.

Club career
Šiklić used to play for Dinamo Zagreb, Lokomotiva, Slaven Belupo, HNK Segesta and Zadar in Croatia and PFC Vihren in Bulgaria.

He transferred to Chongqing Lifan in July 2010.

References

External links
 

1983 births
Living people
Footballers from Zagreb
Association football defenders
Croatian footballers
GNK Dinamo Zagreb players
NK Lokomotiva Zagreb players
NK Slaven Belupo players
HNK Segesta players
OFC Vihren Sandanski players
NK Zadar players
Chongqing Liangjiang Athletic F.C. players
Wuhan F.C. players
Manama Club players
Croatian Football League players
First Professional Football League (Bulgaria) players
Chinese Super League players
China League One players
Bahraini Premier League players
Croatian expatriate footballers
Expatriate footballers in Bulgaria
Croatian expatriate sportspeople in Bulgaria
Expatriate footballers in China
Croatian expatriate sportspeople in China
Expatriate footballers in Bahrain
Croatian expatriate sportspeople in Bahrain